Maccabi "Zvi" Yavne is an Israeli football club based in Yavne. They currently play in Liga Alef.

History
The club was founded in 1962 and played in Liga Gimel, the lowest tier of Israeli football, up until the 1971–72 season, when they started their progress and reached Liga Bet for the first time. In the 1975–76 season, they won Liga Bet South B division and were promoted to Liga Alef. Four seasons later, in the 1979–80 season, they won Liga Alef South division and were promoted to Liga Artzit, the second tier of Israeli football at the time. After 9th-place finish in their debut season in the second tier, they finished 3rd in the 1981–82 season and were promoted to Liga Leumit (then the top division) for the first time in their history. In 1985 they won the Toto Cup, beating Beitar Jerusalem 2–1 in the final. After several lower-mid table finishes, Maccabi were relegated at the end of the 1986–87 season in which they finished 14th.

Maccabi narrowly missed out a return to the top division, on goal difference, in 1989–90, when they finished third, level on points with second-placed Hapoel Tel Aviv. In the following season they were promoted, but were relegated at the end of the 1991–92 season, having finished second bottom.

After a narrow escape in the 1996–97 season, in which they finished one place and one point above the relegation zone, Maccabi were relegated to Liga Alef (then the third tier) at the end of the 1997–98 season, in which they won only one match and gained eight points throughout the entire season. Due to league restructuring, at the end of the following season, they dropped into the fourth tier.

In 2000–01 Maccabi won the South Division of Liga Alef and were promoted back to Liga Artzit. However, they finished bottom of the league in 2001–02 and were relegated back to Liga Alef. At the end of the 2011–12 season, Maccabi beat Hapoel Asi Gilboa on away goals (2–2 on aggregate) in the promotion playoff final and were promoted to Liga Leumit. In the 2015–16 season, the club finished second bottom in Liga Leumit and relegated to Liga Alef.

Current squad
 As of 11 July 2022

Honours

Cups
Toto Cup
Winners 1984–85

League
Second Division:
Runners-up 1988–89, 1990–91
Third Division:
Champions 1975–76, 1979–80, 2011–12
Runners-up 1972–73, 1973–74, 1974–75, 1976–77
Fourth Division:
Champions 1970–71, 2000–01

Former notable managers

 Rafi Cohen (born 1965)

References

External links
Maccabi Yavne Israel Football Association 

Yavne
Yavne F.C.
Association football clubs established in 1962
1962 establishments in Israel
Sport in Yavne